Bellator 280: Bader vs. Kongo 2 was a mixed martial arts event produced by Bellator MMA that took place on May 6, 2022, at AccorHotels Arena in Paris, France.

Background 
After successfully defending his Bellator Heavyweight Title over interim champion Valentin Moldavsky, Ryan Bader made a quick turnaround and faced Cheick Kongo in his second defense in a rematch from their 2019 title bout at Bellator 226. That bout ended due to an accidental poke to Kongo's left eye in the opening round, resulting in a no contest.

A featherweight bout between Pedro Carvalho and Khasan Askhabov was scheduled for this event. However, due to undisclosed reasons, Askhabov was forced to pull out and was replaced by promotional newcomer Piotr Niedzielski.

A bout between Melvin Manhoef and Yoel Romero was scheduled to be the co-main event. However, Manhoef withdrew from the bout due to a hand injury while stopping burglars and was replaced by Alex Polizzi.

A middleweight bout between Lorenz Larkin and Khalid Murtazaliev was scheduled for this event. However at the end of March, Murtazaliev pulled out of the bout and was replaced by Anthony Adams. Adams in turn pulled out as well and was replaced by UFC vet Kyle Stewart.

A heavyweight bout between Davion Franklin and Daniel James was planned for the event. However, James failed an out of competition drug test and was pulled from the bout.

A lightweight bout between Søren Bak and Saul Rogers was scheduled for this event. Due to Rogers pulling out of the bout on two weeks notice, Bak was rescheduled against Charlie Leary in a 160 pound catchweight bout.

A welterweight bout between Nicolò Solli and Joël Kouadja was scheduled for the event. However, the French Athletics Federation scrapped the initial bout and Kouadja's replacement, Levy Carriel, tested positive for COVID-19 five days before the event.

Results

See also 

 2022 in Bellator MMA
 List of Bellator MMA events
 List of current Bellator fighters
 Bellator MMA Rankings

References 

Bellator MMA events
2022 in mixed martial arts
2022 in French sport
Mixed martial arts in France
Sports competitions in Paris
May 2022 sports events in France